Holly Hobbie is a children's TV series developed by Sarah Glinski. It is the second TV adaptation of the Holly Hobbie franchise after Holly Hobbie & Friends. The series is produced by Aircraft Pictures, in association with Cloudco Entertainment and Wexworks Media, and marks the first time Cloudco has produced a live-action series based on one of its properties. The show was released in the United States on Hulu in November 2018, and in Canada on Family Channel in January 2019. The second season was released on Hulu in November 2019. In early 2021, the series was renewed for a third season, which premiered on Hulu on November 23, 2021. It was further renewed by BYUtv for a fourth season, which premiered in May 2022, and a fifth season, which premiered in August 2022.

Cast and characters
 Ruby Jay as Holly Hobbie, a teenage aspiring singer-songwriter living with her family in the small town of Collinsville
 Evan Buliung as Robert, Holly's father
 Erin Karpluk as Katherine, Holly's mother
 Charles Vandervaart as Robbie, Holly's older brother
 Kate Moyer as Heather, Holly's younger sister
 Sara Botsford as Helen (seasons 1–3), Holly's grandmother
 Hunter Dillon as Tyler Flaherty, Collinsville's "rebel" boy
 Saara Chaudry as Amy, one of Holly's best friends
 Kamaia Fairburn as Piper (seasons 1–3), another one of Holly's best friends
 Athena Park as Savannah (seasons 4–5; recurring, seasons 1–2), a rival of Holly who later becomes friends with Amy and Holly
 Marcus Cornwall as Levi (seasons 4–5; recurring, seasons 1–3), a friend of Heather's
 Tomaso Sanelli as Oscar (seasons 4–5; recurring, seasons 2–3), Holly's friend and music partner
 Ava Ro as Claudia (seasons 4–5; recurring, seasons 2–3), a friend of Heather's

Episodes

Series overview

Season 1 (2018)

Season 2 (2019)

Season 3 (2021)

Season 4 (2022)

Season 5 (2022)

Production and release
The show was released in the United States on Hulu on November 16, 2018, aired on Family Channel in Canada which co-commissioned the series for production. In July 2019, the series was renewed for a second season, which was released on Hulu in November 2019. In June 2020, BYUtv acquired television broadcasting rights in the United States to the series, replacing Universal Kids, who had been broadcasting the series since December 2019. In early 2021, Holly Hobbie was renewed for a third season, which was released on Hulu on November 23, 2021, as well as for planned fourth and fifth seasons which will be broadcast by BYUtv. In addition, Disney Channel in the United States acquired the rights to broadcast the first three seasons of the series, which began airing in December 2021.

On June 25, 2019, it was confirmed that the BBC had purchased the British broadcasting rights to the series for it to air on the CBBC Channel. Later, on September 25, 2019, Cloudco pre-sold the series to France Télévisions in France, Minimax in Central and Eastern Europe, and the TVA Group in Quebec. On November 6, 2020, the show's Latin American sales partner Spiral International pre-sold the series to Disney Channel in Latin America and Brazil.

Soundtrack
On June 25, 2019, it was confirmed that Cloudco had signed a deal with Warner Music Group subsidiary ARTS Music to release music from the series and that the show's theme tune would be released on that day. A digital album featuring songs from the first season was released on August 30, 2019. A second digital album titled What Comes Next, containing songs from the second season, was released on November 22, 2019. The show's theme song "Be The Change" and all songs on the soundtrack Music From Holly Hobbie [Songs From Season 1] were written by Cristi Vaughan and Matthew Naylor

Awards

The series received eight Canadian Screen Award nominations at the 8th Canadian Screen Awards in 2020, for Best Children's or Youth Fiction Program or Series, Best Performance in a Children's or Youth Program or Series (3: Chaudry, Dillon, Moyer), Best Direction in a Children's or Youth Program or Series (2: Stefan Brogren for "The Birthday Basher" and Megan Follows for "The Freckled Fugitive") and Best Writing in a Children's or Youth Program or Series (2: Sarah Glinski for "The Mad Muralist" and Cole Bastedo for "The Rabble Rouser".)

References

External links
 
 
 Holly Hobbie at Family Channel website

2010s American children's television series
2010s Canadian children's television series
2020s American children's television series
2020s Canadian children's television series
2018 American television series debuts
2019 Canadian television series debuts
Family Channel (Canadian TV network) original programming
Hulu original programming
Television series about families
Television series about teenagers
Television shows based on toys
Television shows filmed in Ontario
Hulu children's programming